Cheadle Royal may refer to:

Cheadle Royal Hospital, Wilmslow Road, Cheadle, Stockport
Cheadle Royal also describes the district of Cheadle containing the hospital, shopping centre, neighbouring residential areas and related business parks.

Geography of the Metropolitan Borough of Stockport